Buckhorn is a home rule-class city in Perry County, Kentucky, in the United States. The population was 162 at the 2010 census. It is centered on the Buckhorn Presbyterian Church, a log structure listed on the National Register of Historic Places. The Buckhorn Children's Center and Buckhorn Lake State Resort Park are also located here.

The post office was established in 1902. Buckhorn was incorporated by the state legislature in 1996.

History

According to local tradition, the name "Buckhorn" comes from an early settler, Jerry Smith, who had killed a large deer and had hung its antlers over an area spring.  The name of the stream that flows through the area, Squabble Creek, is believed to have been named after a fight between Smith and his brothers.

Geography
Buckhorn is located at  (37.345879, -83.471060).  The city lies in a broad valley along the Middle Fork of the Kentucky River and its tributary, Squabble Creek. Buckhorn Dam and its impoundment, Buckhorn Lake are located a short distance downstream on the river.  Kentucky Route 28 passes through the city.

Demographics

At the 2000 census there were 144 people, 48 households, and 33 families living in the city. The racial makeup of the city was 97.92% White and 2.08% African American.
Of the 48 households 29.2% had children under the age of 18 living with them, 60.4% were married couples living together, 8.3% had a female householder with no husband present, and 31.3% were non-families. 31.3% of households were one person and 16.7% were one person aged 65 or older. The average household size was 2.38 and the average family size was 2.97.

The age distribution was 34.7% under the age of 18, 9.0% from 18 to 24, 27.8% from 25 to 44, 18.1% from 45 to 64, and 10.4% 65 or older. The median age was 30 years. For every 100 females, there were 100.0 males. For every 100 females age 18 and over, there were 108.9 males.

The median household income was $35,000 and the median family income  was $51,250. Males had a median income of $26,250 versus $33,750 for females. The per capita income for the city was $13,742. There were 10.0% of families and 34.2% of the population living below the poverty line, including 5.9% of under eighteens and 55.6% of those over 64.

References

External links

 Buckhorn Children & Family Services

 

Cities in Kentucky
Cities in Perry County, Kentucky
Populated places established in 1996
1996 establishments in Kentucky